Verein für Leibesübungen Wolfsburg e. V., commonly known as VfL Wolfsburg or Wolfsburg, is a German professional sports club based in Wolfsburg, Lower Saxony. The club grew out of a multi-sports club for Volkswagen workers in the city of Wolfsburg. It is best known for its football department, but other departments include badminton, handball and athletics.

The men's professional football team play in the Bundesliga, the top tier of the German football league system. Wolfsburg have won the Bundesliga once in their history, in the 2008–09 season, the DFB-Pokal in 2015 and the DFL-Supercup in 2015.

Professional football is run by the spin-off organization VfL Wolfsburg-Fußball GmbH, a wholly owned subsidiary of the Volkswagen Group. Since 2002, Wolfsburg's stadium is the Volkswagen Arena.

History

A new team in a new city
The city of Wolfsburg was founded in 1938 as Stadt des KdF-Wagen to house autoworkers building the car that would later become famous as the Volkswagen Beetle. The first football club affiliated with the autoworks was known as BSG Volkswagenwerk Stadt des KdF-Wagen, a works team. This team played in the first division Gauliga Osthannover in the 1943–44 and 1944–45 seasons.

On 12 September 1945, in the aftermath of World War II, a new club was formed and was known briefly as VSK Wolfsburg. This side began play in the green and white still worn by VfL today; local youth trainer Bernd Elberskirch had ten green jerseys at his disposal and white bed sheets donated by the public were sewn together by local women to make shorts.

On 15 December 1945, the club went through a crisis that almost ended its existence when all but one of its players left to join 1. FC Wolfsburg. The only player remaining, Josef Meyer, worked with Willi Hilbert to rebuild the side by signing new players. The new group adopted the moniker VfL Wolfsburg, VfL standing for Verein für Leibesübungen. This can be translated as "club for gymnastics" or "club for exercises." Within a year they captured the local Gifhorn title. In late November 1946, the club played a friendly against longtime Gelsenkirchen powerhouse Schalke 04 at the stadium owned by Volkswagen, emerging as the successor to BSG as the company sponsored side.

Postwar play

The club made slow but steady progress in the following seasons. They captured a number of amateur level championships, but were unable to advance out of the promotion playoffs until finally breaking through to the top tier Oberliga Nord in 1954 with a 2–1 victory over Heider SV. Wolfsburg, however, struggled in the top flight, narrowly missing relegation each season until finally being sent down in 1959. When Germany's first professional football league, the Bundesliga, was formed in 1963, Wolfsburg was playing in the Regionalliga Nord (II) having just moved up from the Verbandsliga Niedersachsen (III), reaching the German Amateur Championship Final that same year (0–1 vs. VfB Stuttgart Amat.).

Second division and advance to the Bundesliga
Wolfsburg remained a second division fixture over the next dozen years with their best performance being a second-place finish in 1970. That finish earned the club entry to the promotion round playoffs for the Bundesliga, where they performed poorly and were unable to advance. From the mid-1970s through to the early 1990s, Die Wölfe played as a third division side in the Amateur Oberliga Nord. Consecutive first-place finishes in 1991 and 1992, followed by success in the promotion playoffs, saw the club advance to the 2. Bundesliga for the 1992–93 season.

Wolfsburg continued to enjoy some success through the 1990s. The team advanced to the final of the German Cup in 1995 where they were beaten 0–3 by Borussia Mönchengladbach, but then went on to the top flight on the strength of a second-place league finish in 1997.

Early predictions were that the club would immediately be sent back down, but instead, the Wolves developed into a mid-table Bundesliga side. In the 1998–99 season, Wolfsburg, under Wolfgang Wolf, were holding onto the fifth spot in the 33rd round of fixtures, and they had hopes of making fourth place, to gain UEFA Champions League participation. Losing 6–1 away to MSV Duisburg in the final fixture, the Wolves finished in sixth place with 55 points and qualified for next season's UEFA Cup. They also qualified for the Intertoto Cup in 2000, 2001, 2003, 2004 and 2005, enjoying their best run in 2003 after reaching the final in which they lost to Italian side Perugia. This was followed by a couple of seasons of little success for the club, just narrowly avoiding relegation with two 15th-place finishes in the 2005–06 and 2006–07 seasons.

2008–present

For the 2007–08 season, the club hired former Bayern Munich manager Felix Magath, with whom they managed to finish in fifth place at the end of the season, the highest finish for the club at the time. This also enabled the Wolves to qualify for the UEFA Cup for only the second time in their history.

In the 2008–09 season, under Magath, Wolfsburg claimed their biggest success by winning their first Bundesliga title after defeating Werder Bremen 5–1 on 23 May 2009. During this campaign, Wolfsburg equalled the longest winning streak in one Bundesliga season with ten successive victories after the winter break. They also became the only team in the Bundesliga to have had two strikers scoring more than 20 goals each in one season, with Brazilian Grafite and Bosnian Edin Džeko achieving this feat in their title-winning season, scoring 28 and 26, respectively, with Zvjezdan Misimović adding a record 20 assists. As a result of their title win, Wolfsburg qualified for the UEFA Champions League for the first time in their history.

In the 2009–10 season, Wolfsburg dismissed their newly appointed trainer Armin Veh after the winter break due to lack of success, with the club sitting tenth in the league. In the Champions League, they came third in their group, behind Manchester United and CSKA Moscow, losing the chance for a place in the competition's successive round. As a result, they qualified for the Round of 32 phase of the UEFA Europa League. They defeated Spanish side Villarreal 6–3 on aggregate and Russian champions Rubin Kazan 3–2. In the quarter-finals, however, they were beaten 3–1 by eventual finalists Fulham.

On 11 May 2010, the permanent head coach's position was filled by former England manager Steve McClaren. After having guided Twente to their first ever Dutch title, he was rewarded by becoming the first English coach to manage a Bundesliga side. On 7 February 2011, however, it was announced that McClaren had been sacked and that Pierre Littbarski would be taking over. Wolfsburg lost four times in five matches under him and they finally slipped into the relegation places.

On 18 March 2011, Wolfsburg confirmed that Felix Magath would return as head coach and sporting director, almost two years since he led them to the Bundesliga title and just two days after being fired from his position at Schalke 04. He signed a two-year contract with the club. Magath steered the club to safety, but though the club invested heavily, Magath could only achieve a mid-table finish in the following 2011–12 season. After only five points in eight matches (and no goals and points in the last four games) in the 2012–13 season, Magath left the club by mutual consent and was temporarily replaced by former Wolfsburg reserve team coach Lorenz-Günther Köstner. On 22 December 2012, the former 1. FC Nürnberg head coach Dieter Hecking was appointed as Wolfsburg's new head coach on a contract lasting until 2016.

On 2 February 2015, Wolfsburg purchased the German international forward André Schürrle for a fee of €30 million from Chelsea. With a reinforced squad, the club finished as runners-up in the 2014–15 Bundesliga behind Bayern Munich, thus automatically qualifying for the 2015–16 Champions League group stage. On 30 May, the team then won the 2015 DFB-Pokal Final 3–1 against Borussia Dortmund, the first German Cup victory in the history of the club.

On 1 August, to begin the 2015–16 season, Wolfsburg defeated the Bundesliga champions Bayern Munich in the 2015 DFL-Supercup on penalties. At the end of the 2015 summer transfer window, Wolfsburg sold the 2014–15 Footballer of the Year (Germany) Kevin De Bruyne to Manchester City for a reported Bundesliga record fee of €75 million.

The 2015–16 campaign saw Wolfsburg finish in eighth place. The Bundesliga match between Bayern and Wolfsburg saw an extraordinary five goals in nine minutes by Robert Lewandowski. In the Champions League, they reached the quarter-finals for the first time, where they faced Real Madrid and, despite a two-goal aggregate lead from the first match, were eliminated after losing 3–0 at the Santiago Bernabéu Stadium in Madrid.

In January 2017, Wolfsburg signed a letter of intent to partner the American side Chattanooga FC, which includes women's football, youth development and local social responsibility. The two teams mentioned the future possibility of international friendlies.

Wolfsburg struggled through the 2016–17 season, rotating through several managers and eventually finishing in 16th place in the Bundesliga with only 37 points, putting them in a playoff against Eintracht Braunschweig, which they won 2–0 on aggregate to remain in the top flight.

The 2017–18 season proved to be another disappointing season, in which they finished 16th place in the Bundesliga, putting them in a play-off against Holstein Kiel, a game that they won 4–1 on aggregate.

In the 2018–19 season, Wolfsburg finished 6th in the Bundesliga, thus automatically qualifying for the 2019–20 UEFA Europa League.

In the draw for the Europa League third qualifying round, Wolfsburg drew the Ukrainian Team Desna Chernihiv. Wolfsburg won 2–0 at the AOK Stadion, advancing to the play-off round. At the play-off round they lost 2–1 against AEK Athens.

On 24 May 2022, Niko Kovač was appointed as Wolfsburg's new head coach with contract lasting until June 2025.

Home stadium
Wolfsburg plays at the Volkswagen Arena, a multi-purpose stadium which seats a total capacity of 30,000 spectators. Before construction was finished in 2002, Wolfsburg played their home games at the 21,600 capacity VfL-Stadium. The stadium is currently used mostly for the home games of Wolfsburg, and is the site where they won their first Bundesliga title in the 2008–09 season. The amateur squad and the women's association football section is playing since 2015 at the newly built AOK Stadion with a capacity of 5200 people. There is also a new VfL-Center with offices and training areas and the VfL-FußballWelt, an interactive exhibition about the VfL.

Honours

Domestic
Bundesliga:
Winners: 2008–09
Runners-up: 2014–15
DFB-Pokal:
Winners: 2014–15
Runners-up: 1994–95
DFL-Supercup:
Winners: 2015

Regional
Deutsche Amateurmeisterschaft:
Runners-up: 1963
Amateuroberliga Niedersachsen-Ost (II):
Winners: 1952, 1954, 1963
Regionalliga Nord (II):
Runners-up: 1970
Oberliga Nord (III):
Winners: 1991, 1992
Runners-up: 1976, 1978, 1988
Lower Saxony Cup (Tiers 3–5)
Winners: 1962, 2002, 2003

Youth
 German Under 19 championship
Winners: 2010–11, 2012–13
Runners-up:  2007–08
 Under 19 Bundesliga North/Northeast
Winners: 2007–08, 2010–11, 2011–12, 2012–13
 Under 17 Bundesliga North/Northeast
Winners: 2008–09, 2015–16

Players

Current squad

Players out on loan

Retired numbers

 19   Junior Malanda, midfielder (2013–15) – posthumous honour
 Starting from 2019–20, Kevin Mbabu would wear the number 19.

VfL Wolfsburg II squad

Women's section

The women's team have won a treble of Bundesliga, DFB Pokal and the UEFA Women's Champions League in 2012–13. They defended their Champions League title in 2014.

Coaching staff

Record in Europe

Records and statistics
Only for Bundesliga

Most appearances

Top scorers

Coaches

 Günter Mettke (1949–1954, player-coach)
 Ludwig Lachner (1954–55)
 Ernst Sontow (1955–56)
 Josef Kretschmann (1956–57)
 Ludwig Lachner (1957)
 Walter Risse (1957–58)
 Imre Farkaszinski (1958–59)
 Ludwig Lachner (1 July 1963 – 30 June 1966)
 Imre Farkaszinski (1 July 1966 – 31 December 1974)
 Fritz Schollmeyer (1 January 1975 – 29 April 1975)
 Günther Brockmeyer (April 1975)
 Paul Kietzmann (3 May 1975 – 28 November 1975)
 Radoslav Momirski (2 December 1976 – 4 March 1978)
 Imre Farkaszinski (March 1978 – Dec 1978)
 Henk van Meteren (Dec 1978 – April 1979)
 Wilfried Kemmer (April 1979 – Oct 1983)
 Imre Farkaszinski (Oct 1983 – June 1984)
 Wolf-Rüdiger Krause (July 1984 – June 1988)
 Horst Hrubesch (1 July 1988 – 30 June 1989)
 Ernst Menzel (July 1989 – June 1991)
 Uwe Erkenbrecher (1 July 1991 – 10 February 1993)
 Eckhard Krautzun (16 February 1993 – 4 April 1995)
 Gerd Roggensack (6 April 1995 – 22 October 1995)
 Willi Reimann (23 October 1995 – 17 March 1998)
 Wolfgang Wolf (23 March 1998 – 4 March 2003)
 Jürgen Röber (4 March 2003 – 3 April 2004)
 Eric Gerets (4 April 2004 – 29 May 2005)
 Holger Fach (1 July 2005 – 19 December 2005)
 Klaus Augenthaler (29 December 2005 – 19 May 2007)
 Felix Magath (1 July 2007 – 30 June 2009)
 Armin Veh (1 July 2009 – 25 January 2010)
 L-G. Köstner (interim) (25 January 2010 – 30 June 2010)
 Steve McClaren (1 July 2010 – 7 February 2011)
 P. Littbarski (interim) (8 February 2011 – 17 March 2011)
 Felix Magath (18 March 2011 – 25 October 2012)
 L-G. Köstner (interim) (25 October 2012 – 31 December 2012)
 Dieter Hecking (1 January 2013 – 17 October 2016)
 Valérien Ismaël (17 October 2016 – 26 February 2017)
 Andries Jonker (27 February 2017 – 17 September 2017)
 Martin Schmidt (18 September 2017 – 19 February 2018)
 Bruno Labbadia (20 February 2018 – 29 June 2019)
 Oliver Glasner (1 July 2019 – 26 May 2021)
 Mark van Bommel (1 July 2021 – 24 October 2021)
 Florian Kohfeldt (26 October 2021 – 15 May 2022)
 Niko Kovač (24 May 2022 – present)

See also
Works team

References

External links

 

 
Football clubs in Germany
Football clubs in Lower Saxony
Multi-sport clubs in Germany
Association football clubs established in 1945
1945 establishments in Germany
Volkswagen Group
Works association football clubs in Germany
Bundesliga clubs
Wolfsburg
2. Bundesliga clubs